The Negro of Banyoles (or ) was a controversial piece of taxidermy of a San individual, which used to be a major attraction in the Darder Museum of Banyoles (Catalonia, Spain). In 2000, the remains of the man were sent to Botswana for burial.

History

In 1830, the Verreaux brothers stuffed the corpse of a member of the San, analysis of the teeth showed that man was approximately 27 years old, having features typical of the African bushman. In 1916, it was acquired by the Darder Museum of Banyoles. The body remained in the museum without controversy until 29 October 1991. At this date Alphonse Arcelin, a doctor of Haitian origin who lived in Cambrils where he was a PSC councillor, wrote a letter to the mayor of Banyoles, Joan Solana, asking him to stop displaying the San's remains. This request attracted the attention of the press, which widely published the story.

The first step towards the return of the "negre" to Botswana was made in 1991, when the then-secretary of UNESCO, Federico Mayor Zaragoza, held the meeting with Joan Solana. Later, when Kofi Annan became Secretary-General of the United Nations, he expressed interest in the issue and spoke with Solana.

By that time, the "negre" had become so notorious that it was quite usual to hear references made to the displayed San in diplomatic communications. Some African governments showed their support for Arcelín, who had sent several letters to the press and various heads of government. The issue worried many international museum associations because it made them fear that human remains kept in museums might have to be returned to their place of origin.

In 1997, the issue was repeatedly discussed by both the UN and the Organisation of African Unity. Later, in March of that year, the body was removed from the Darder Museum. It was described in El Mundo as a relic of colonialism. Many people in Banyoles and the surrounding area were unhappy with the removal because the San was seen as "a member of the community".

Return to Africa
Botswana's government offered to aid the OAU bury the man, once all of his remains were returned to Africa. In 2000, after the loincloth, feathered head-dress and spear he had worn in Banyoles were removed, the body was sent to the National Museum of Anthropology in Madrid where artificial parts including a wooden spine, eyes, hair, and genitals were removed. The skull and remaining bones were then sent to Botswana in a coffin and they arrived on 4 October. He was buried on 5 October in Tsholofelo Park, in Gaborone; his gravesite was declared a national monument.

Legacy
The Darder Museum currently avoids any references to the controversy of the "negre of Banyoles". The only record of the San in the museum is a silent video with black and white images on a small plasma screen. The video allows people to see the San as he was displayed until his removal.

Several books have dealt with the "el negre" controversy, most notably El Negro en ik (El Negro and me) by Frank Westerman, which shows that naturalist Georges Cuvier knew about the man.

See also
 Human zoo
 Julia Pastrana, a sideshow performer preserved via taxidermy
 Ota Benga
 Repatriation of human remains
 Saartjie Baartman
 Scientific racism

Bibliography 
 Davies, Caitlin: The Return of El Negro. Johannesburg: Penguin Books 2003.
 Fock, Stefanie: »Un individu de raça negroide«. El Negro und die Wunderkammern des Rassismus. In: Entfremdete Körper. Rassismus als Leichenschändung, ed. Wulf D. Hund. Bielefeld: transcript 2009, pp. 165 – 204.
 Westermann, Frank: El Negro en ik. Amsterdam: Atlas 2004.

References

External links
Sample translation of El Negro and Me

Human taxidermy
1830s deaths
Province of Girona
Pla de l'Estany
2000 in Botswana
Year of birth missing
San people
Racism in Spain